The Welsh Crown Green Bowling Association (WCGBA), founded 1927, is the national governing body for crown green bowling in Wales. The WCGBA organise competitions, including the Welsh Club Championship, and select and manage the national side.

See also
Welsh Bowls Federation
Welsh Bowling Association
Welsh Indoor Bowls Association
Welsh Ladies Indoor Bowling Association
Welsh Short Mat Bowls Association
Welsh Women’s Bowling Association

References

External links
Official website

Sports governing bodies in Wales
Bowls in Wales
1927 establishments in Wales